Swannanoa is a small village in Canterbury, New Zealand. It is located 35 kilometres northwest of the largest city in the South Island, Christchurch. The population is slowly increasing due to new subdivisions being developed there and in neighbouring Mandeville North.

Demographics 

Swannanoa-Eyreton had a population of 954 at the 2018 New Zealand census, an increase of 48 people (5.3%) since the 2013 census, and an increase of 255 people (36.5%) since the 2006 census. There were 333 households. There were 468 males and 486 females, giving a sex ratio of 0.96 males per female. The median age was 42.6 years (compared with 37.4 years nationally), with 180 people (18.9%) aged under 15 years, 177 (18.6%) aged 15 to 29, 489 (51.3%) aged 30 to 64, and 108 (11.3%) aged 65 or older.

Ethnicities were 94.3% European/Pākehā, 6.0% Māori, 0.9% Pacific peoples, 2.2% Asian, and 2.5% other ethnicities (totals add to more than 100% since people could identify with multiple ethnicities).

The proportion of people born overseas was 16.7%, compared with 27.1% nationally.

Although some people objected to giving their religion, 55.7% had no religion, 33.3% were Christian and 2.5% had other religions.

Of those at least 15 years old, 165 (21.3%) people had a bachelor or higher degree, and 120 (15.5%) people had no formal qualifications. The median income was $39,100, compared with $31,800 nationally. The employment status of those at least 15 was that 429 (55.4%) people were employed full-time, 159 (20.5%) were part-time, and 15 (1.9%) were unemployed.

Education

Swannanoa School is a state co-educational full primary school, established in 1871, with a decile rating of 10 and a roll of  students (as of

History

John Evans Brown 
American John Evans Brown, arrived in Canterbury in 1864 and was known by the locals as "Yankee Brown". Brown settled a farm in Canterbury on land owned by his brother in-law John Thomas Peacock, and named it after the Swannanoa River in Western North Carolina. He was elected to the Rangiora and Mandeville Road Board in January 1865. At the first Northern A & P show held in 1866, he and his family showed various birds; he won a prize for a peacock and his family won prizes for four different sorts of pigeons. When Brown eventually returned to Asheville, North Carolina, he named his home there "Zelandia".

Peacock Family 
John Thomas Peacock owned the land in which Swannanoa farm existed on in 1864, which was then transferred to his father, John Jenkins Peacock, in 1865. The land would remain in the Peacock family name until 1903, when it was sold to Vince William Wright.

Petrie Family 
The Swannanoa farm is currently owned, and has been operated by the Petrie Family since 1957.

Church 
The church, which resides nearby to Swannanoa School, was opened in 1873, and was primarily funded by John Evans Brown.

Tram Road and Railway 
In 1871, a meeting in the district showed that communication in the district was poor, with dray loads taking up to two days to reach Kaiapoi. By this stage, a plan for the Oxford-Rangiora branch line had already been approved by the Rangiora, Mandeville and Oxford Road Boards. The Eyre settlers asked at this time why it could not pass through their district on its way to Oxford, but a line from Kaiapoi to Oxford was seen as a threat to the Rangiora lines. A straight-line survey from Kaiapoi to Oxford was carried out in 1871, this being the road now known as Tram Road. Further surveys were carried out during 1872 of all the possible lines for the area.

The Eyre settlers continued lobbying for a line to pass through Ohoka, Mandeville, Swannanoa and West Eyreton. Eventually they prevailed and the government agreed to construct both lines, 10 km apart, which would become the Eyreton Branch. However, the line ended at West Eyreton, rather than carrying on all the way to Oxford. In August 1872, plans were finalised for the Eyreton line and construction began. It was completed in 1875 and opened on 17 December. The first train left West Eyreton for Kaiapoi on 27 December 1875. Shortly after opening, the Public Works Department announced it would be necessary to join the West Eyreton and Oxford lines to avoid losing money and on 1 February 1878, the West Eyreton-Oxford section opened.

World land speed record
New Zealand motorcycle speed record holder Russell Wright gained the Motorcycle land-speed record, reaching 184.83 miles per hour on a Vincent-HRD Black Lightning motorcycle loaned by David Topliss, of Nelson on 2 July 1955, on Tram Road. A plaque commemorates the achievement.

Tram Road, the main road through Swannanoa, is an almost dead straight, 22 kilometre two-lane road. It is a popular location for speed trial events. This World Record is unusual as most that were officially recognised were achieved in the United States on open expanses of salt flat while this world record was achieved on a narrow, public road "still drying out from rain the night before".

After he had set one world record, Wright dismounted, and a Scottish immigrant, Bob Burns, attached a light sidecar to the Lightning. Burns then set another world record for sidecars. His two runs averaged

References

External links
 Swannanoa
 Residents adjacent to Swannanoa, NC, USA, visit Swannanoa, NZ, in April 2017, per their Black Mountain News
 

Waimakariri District
Populated places in Canterbury, New Zealand